Beaubien is a surname. Notable people with the surname include:

 Arthur-Lucien Beaubien (1879–1971), Canadian politician and farmer
 Charles Beaubien (1748–1794), French Canadian trader
 Charles H. Beaubien (1800–1864), Canadian-born American fur trader
 Joseph-Octave Beaubien (1824–1877), Quebec physician and political figure
 Layne Beaubien (born 1976), American water polo player
 Louis Beaubien (1837–1915), Canadian politician
 Louis-Philippe Beaubien (1903–1985), Canadian politician
 Marcel Beaubien (born c. 1942), Canadian politician
 Mark H. Beaubien Jr. (1942–2011), American politician
 Philippe de Gaspé Beaubien (born 1928), Canadian media proprietor
 Pierre Beaubien (1796–1881), Canadian physician and political figure